Angelbite is the fifth studio album by Dutch rock and roll band Claw Boys Claw. The album comes at a transitional time; the band had been let go by Polydor and the two albums released on Megadisc had not been very successful. This is their sole release on the small label Solid. The band changed personnel also: early members Bobbie Rossini (bass) and Marius Schrader (drums) had left the band at the end of 1988, and were replaced by Arno Kooy and Marc Lamb, respectively. This was Kooy's sole recording with Claw Boys Claw; Lamb is still with the band.

Angelbite, musically, points to the later "swamp rock" sound the band would adopt. The album was not a great commercial success; it never charted, nor did any of the two singles from it.

John Cale was to have produced the album; he had met the band while they were in the United States at the New Music Seminar, summer 1988. In the end, Angelbite was produced by Steve Parker, who had earlier produced The Fall and Mathilde Santing.

Track listing

Credits

John Cameron - guitar
Pete TeBos - vocals
Arno Kooy - bass
Marc Lamb - drums
Steve Parker - producer

References

See also
Claw Boys Claw discography

1990 albums
Claw Boys Claw albums